The Baltimore Colts joined the National Football League (NFL) in 1953 where they participated in their first NFL Draft and selected Billy Vessels, a halfback from the University of Oklahoma. The team's most recent first-round selection was Kwity Paye, a defensive end from Michigan in the 2021 NFL Draft.

Every year during April, each NFL franchise seeks to add new players to its roster through a collegiate draft officially known as the NFL Annual Player Selection Meeting but more commonly known as the NFL Draft. Teams are ranked in inverse order based on the previous season's record, with the worst record picking first, and the second worst picking second and so on. The two exceptions to this order are made for teams that appeared in the previous Super Bowl; the Super Bowl champion always picks last, and the Super Bowl loser always picks second last. Teams have the option of trading away their picks to other teams for different picks, players, cash, or a combination thereof.  Thus, it is not uncommon for a team's actual draft pick to differ from their assigned draft pick, or for a team to have extra or no draft picks in any round due to these trades.

The Colts have selected the number one overall pick in the draft on seven separate occasions, one of which was used to select Super Bowl XLI MVP Peyton Manning.  They have also selected the second overall pick five times and the third overall pick twice. The team's five selections from Ohio State University are the most chosen by the Colts from one university.

Key

Player selections

Notes

References

 
 
 
 
 

Indianapolis Colts

first-round draft picks